Sanjna (Sanskrit: संज्ञा, IAST: Saṃjñā), also known as Saranyu (IAST: Saraṇyū), is a Hindu goddess and the chief consort of Surya, the Sun god. She is mentioned in the Rigveda, and also appears in later Hindu scriptures including the Harivamsa and the Puranas.

Described as the daughter of the craftsman deity Tvashta (often identified with Vishvakarma), Sanjna temporarily abandoned her husband as she was unable to bear his heat and brilliance. She is mentioned as the mother of the death god Yama, the river-goddess Yami, the current Manu, the divine twin physicians Ashvins and the god Revanta.

Etymology and epithets
 is the female form of the adjective , meaning "quick, fleet, nimble", used for rivers and wind in the Rigveda (compare also Sarayu). Saranyu has been described as "the swift-speeding storm cloud". In the later text named Harivamsa (5th century C.E.), Saranyu is known as Sanjna or Samjna , which means 'image', 'sign' or 'name'. Samjna is sometimes known by the name Sandhya (lit. 'twilight').

Textual sources and family

Sanjna is mentioned in the Rigveda (c. 1200-1000 BCE), where she is referred to as Saranyu and is described to be the daughter of deity Tvastar and the twin sister of Trisiras. Her husband is Vivasvan, whom she temporarily abandoned and appointed Sadrisha (lookalike woman) to foster her children. The story of Saranyu abandoning her husband is then narrated in Yaksha's Nirukta (c. 500 BCE). The text of Bṛhaddevatā also narrates the same story with additional details of Ashvin's birth.

The epic Harivamsa (c. 5th century CE) first mentions Saranyu as Sanjna and there is a significant expansion of the myth. The Puranic scriptures like the Markandeya Purana, the Matsya Purana and the Kurma described Sanjna as the daughter of Vishwakarma (identified with Tvashta) and her lookalike is called Chhaya ('reflection' or 'shadow'). However in Bhagavata Purana, Chhaya is her biological sister.

Most scriptures mention 6 children of Surya by Saranyu:
Shraddhadeva Manu — ancestor of humans
Yama — Lord of Death
Yami — Lady of Yamuna
Ashvins — The divine twin physicians.
Revanta — Master of horses

However, as per Kurma Purana and Bhagavata Purana, Sanjna has only three children  Shraddhadeva Manu, Yama and Yamuna (Yami).

Legends

According to many texts, the craftsman deity Vishwakarma, also known as Tvastar, has two children Samjna and Trisiras. After Saranyu grows into a beautiful maiden, he arranges his daughter's Svayamvara, a custom in which a lady chooses her husband from the group of eligible suitors. Samjna marries Surya (alias Vivasvan), the sun god.

Samjna is unsatisfied with her marital life. The Harivamsa states that power and heat of Surya has made him unpleasant looking to her, while according to the Markandeya Purana, Samjna's behaviour changes as she is unable to bear  Surya's splendor or heat. Her behaviour angers Surya and he curses her next born children. After the birth of Yama and Yami, she is unable to tolerate more and decides to abandon her husband. Before leaving, she creates a similar looking woman from her shadow (Chhaya) and asks her to take care of the children. However, in Vedic accounts, the lady is a similar looking woman named Savarna. According to Harivamsa and Markandeya Purana, Samjna reaches her father's abode but is asked by him to return. Helpless, she assumes the form of a mare and roams in the forest of Kuru. In the Vishnu Purana, a similar legend is recited by the sage Parashara but Samjna leaves Surya to gain control over his heat by performing tapas in the forest.

Meanwhile, Surya, unaware of the replacement, impregnates the look alike. Chhaya is partial to her own children. Yama later abuses and threatens her with his leg in the Harivamsa, while the Markandeya Purana tells that he kicks her. All texts mention that Chhaya casts a curse on him. In some versions, she curses Yama's leg to get infected with worms or fall apart or both. Surya gets to know that she was not Yama's mother due to the harsh punishment which a mother wouldn't consider. This behaviour of a mother to her child makes Surya suspicious and after confronting Chhaya, she discloses the whole incident.

Distressed, Surya goes to his father in law, and asks him to cure his splendor. Vishwakarma then reduces Surya's glory, making him pleasant to behold. Surya then locates Samjna, who was in the form of a mare, and after finding her, he assumes the form of a stallion and engages in love making with her. Samjna delivers twins Ashvins through her nose. Surya shows his normal form to her. Sanjana is pleased to see her husband's beauty and returns to her abode with her new-born twins. Unlike the previous version of Harivamsa, Markandeya Purana states that Surya asks his father in law to reduce his heat after the birth of Ashvins. Some texts also add Revant, the divine master of horses, as the son of Sanjana.

In many Puranas, Vishvakarma uses Surya's heat to create many celestial weapons.

Notes

Citations

References

External links

Hindu goddesses
Sky and weather goddesses